Construction News was an American weekly journal published in Chicago, Illinois. It was established in the late 19th century and published by The Construction News Company.

History 
In 1914, its editor was Harry W. Culbertson, while its news editor was R. B. Rice.

The publication was renamed American Contractor.

References 

Weekly magazines published in the United States
Magazines established in the 19th century
Defunct magazines published in the United States
Magazines published in Chicago